Telaki  is a village in the administrative district of Gmina Kosów Lacki, within Sokołów County, Masovian Voivodeship, in east-central Poland.

The village has a population of 760.

References

Telaki